J. Ellwood "Woody" Ludwig (January 12, 1911 – January 29, 2001) was an American football, basketball, baseball coach. He served as the head football coach at Bucknell University from 1944 to 1945 and Pennsylvania Military—now known as Widener University—from 1947 to 1952, compiling a career college football coaching record of 33–31–3. Ludwig was the head basketball coach at Bucknell from 1943 to 1947 and Pennsylvania Military from 1947 to 1953, amassing a career college basketball coaching record of 105–73. He was also the head baseball coach at Bucknell in 1944, tallying a mark of 10–2.

Head coaching record

Football

References

External links
 

1911 births
2001 deaths
Basketball coaches from Pennsylvania
Bucknell Bison baseball coaches
Bucknell Bison football coaches
Bucknell Bison men's basketball coaches
Penn Quakers football players
Widener Pride football coaches
Widener Pride men's basketball coaches
High school basketball coaches in Michigan
People from Pottstown, Pennsylvania
Players of American football from Pennsylvania
Sportspeople from Montgomery County, Pennsylvania